USS Kingfisher (SP-76), a motor launch, was built in 1916 by George Lawley & Sons, Neponset, Massachusetts; acquired by the U.S. Navy on 8 May 1917 from her owner, R. P. Mathiesson, Chicago, Illinois; and commissioned 15 May at Newport, Rhode Island.

Assigned to the 2nd Naval District, Newport, Rhode Island, Kingfisher enrolled in the Naval Coast Defense Reserve on 9 June. Based at New London, Connecticut, she patrolled Long Island Sound.

On 7 January 1919 she was ordered returned to her former owner. USS Kingfisher decommissioned 22 January, and was turned over to her previous owner 4 March.

References 

Ships built in Boston
World War I patrol vessels of the United States
1916 ships
Patrol vessels of the United States Navy